Maksim Baranau (born 11 April 1988) is a Belarusian handball player for HC Meshkov Brest and the Belarusian national team.

References

External links

1988 births
Living people
Belarusian male handball players
People from Babruysk
Belarusian expatriate sportspeople in Romania
Expatriate handball players
Sportspeople from Mogilev Region